Louis Schaub (born 29 December 1994) is a professional footballer who plays as an attacking midfielder for 2. Bundesliga club Hannover 96. Born in Germany, he represents the Austria national team.

He was selected by influential football website IBWM in their list of the 100 most exciting players in world football for 2014.

Club career
Schaub made his debut for Rapid Wien's senior team in the 3–0 Austrian Football Bundesliga win over Sturm Graz on 18 August 2012. On 4 August 2015, Schaub scored two goals, including the winning goal in an unexpected 3–2 victory for Rapid Wien against Ajax Amsterdam in the UEFA Champions League qualifier.

Having played for 1. FC Köln since 2018, Schaub was loaned to Swiss side Luzern for the 2020–21 season. He joined Hannover 96 on a free transfer in July 2022.

International career
Schaub has been capped at four different age groups for Austria. He made his debut for Austria U21 in a 2015 UEFA European Under-21 Football Championship qualification Group 4 1–0 win over Albania U21 on 14 August 2013, coming on as a 76th-minute substitute.

Schaub was named in Austria's senior squad for a 2018 FIFA World Cup qualifier against Wales in September 2016.

Personal life
Schaub was born into a mixed German-Austrian family. His mother is Austrian and his father German, making him eligible to represent either nation internationally. His father, Fred Schaub, was a professional football player as well, having spent most of his career in the German Bundesliga. Fred Schaub died in April 2003 in a car accident; Louis was in the car and survived the accident. His younger sister Chiara also plays football and has represented Austria at youth level.

Career statistics

International goals 

Scores and results list Austria's goal tally first, score column indicates score after each Schaub goal.

References

External links

1994 births
Living people
Footballers from Hesse
People from Fulda
Sportspeople from Kassel (region)
People with acquired Austrian citizenship
Association football midfielders
Austrian footballers
Austria youth international footballers
Austria under-21 international footballers
Austria international footballers
Austrian Football Bundesliga players
German footballers
Austrian people of German descent
German people of Austrian descent
Bundesliga players
2. Bundesliga players
SK Rapid Wien players
1. FC Köln players
UEFA Euro 2020 players
Hannover 96 players
Austrian expatriate footballers
German expatriate footballers
Expatriate footballers in Switzerland
Austrian expatriate sportspeople in Switzerland
German expatriate sportspeople in Switzerland